Uchte is a municipality in the district of Nienburg, in Lower Saxony, Germany.

Uchte is also the seat of the Samtgemeinde ("collective municipality") Uchte.

Town twinning 
Uchte has Sourdeval, Normandy as a twin town since 1992, and Ząbkowice Śląskie since 2005.

See also 
Girl of the Uchter Moor

References

Nienburg (district)